Empress Canadian Pacific Railway Station is a one-story timber building in Empress, Alberta that formerly served as the community's Canadian Pacific Railway station.  It was designated under the Heritage Railway Stations Protection Act in On June 1, 1991.  It was recognized as a Provincial Historic Resource by the government of Alberta on June 28, 2002.

See also

Empress Airport
Empress, Alberta
 List of designated heritage railway stations of Canada

References

Canadian Pacific Railway stations in Alberta
Designated Heritage Railway Stations in Alberta
Special Area No. 2
Disused railway stations in Canada
Provincial Historic Resources of Alberta
Railway stations in Canada opened in 1914
1914 establishments in Alberta